Auf rote Rosen fallen Tränen (Tears Fall on Red Roses) is the fourteenth studio album released by German Schlager group Die Flippers.

References

1985 albums
Die Flippers albums
German-language albums